Reda Ereyahi  (born 23 October 1972) is a former Moroccan footballer who usually played as a midfielder.

Club career
Born in El Jadida, Ereyahi began his senior career with local side Difaâ Hassani El Jadidi. A transfer to France with SC Bastia fell through in 1995, and he ultimately moved to Raja Casablanca from 1997 through 2000, where he won two national titles and played in the 2000 FIFA Club World Championship. He then had a spell with Göztepe in the Turkish Super Lig during 2000. 16 years after making his senior debut with Difaâ Hassani El Jadidi, Ereyahi returned to the club, where he would finish his playing career.

International career
Ereyahi has made eight appearances for the Morocco national football team, including two friendlies during 1996 and another in 1998.

Honours

Raja Casablanca 

Moroccan first division:
Winner: 1996–97, 1997–98, 1998–99
Runner-up: 2008–09
CAF Champions League:
Winner: 1997, 1999

Individual

Best Player of Moroccan first division: 1997–98
Top scorer of Moroccan  division: 2004–05

References

External links

1972 births
Living people
Moroccan footballers
Morocco international footballers
Moroccan expatriate footballers
Raja CA players
Difaâ Hassani El Jadidi managers
Göztepe S.K. footballers
Difaâ Hassani El Jadidi players
Süper Lig players
Al Dhafra FC players
Expatriate footballers in Turkey
People from El Jadida
Association football midfielders
Moroccan football managers